Heinrich Gersmeier  known as Schäfer Heinrich is  a German farmer, who was looking for a woman in the German TV show Bauer sucht Frau. He sang a song about his life as shepherd.

Personal life 
He keeps 400 sheep on his farm in the "Hellweg Börde". After the death of his father in 1998, he lived with his mother Johanna in Völlinghausen (City Erwitte). In 2008 he was a candidate at the german TV-Show Bauer sucht Frau. At this show he sang "Das Schäferlied" ("The shepherd song"). He sang this song often at village festivals, was recorded with EMI Music. The song was a top 10 hit in Germany and reached No.5.

He sang at many music festivals, in discos and at the Ballermann in Mallorca.  His mother died in 2011. He was on many TV-shows like Promi-Frauentausch or Mitten im Leben. At 2010 his first PC-Game Schäfer Heinrichs Bauernhof-Simulator was released. At 2018 his first movie Schäfer Heinrich - Der Film will be released.

Discography

Singles
 2008: "Das Schäferlied"
 2009: Schäfchen zählen
 2010: Schatzi, ich schubs Dich heute ins Heu
 2011: Das schöne Mädchen von Seite 1
 2012: Ich bin scha(r)f auf dich
 2012: Für Gaby tu’ ich alles
 2012: Im Traktor vor mir
 2013: Millionen Frauen lieben mich
 2014: Alle Schafe sind schon da
 2015: Schäfer Heinrich hat ne Farm
 2016: Für Schafe tu’ ich alles
 2017: Ladykiller

Awards
 2015: Ballermann-Award at the categorie „Ballermann Award der Jury für Kultstatus“
 2016: Ballermann-Award

References

External links

German farmers
German male singers
Living people
Year of birth missing (living people)